The Vienna Crime Museum is a crime museum in Vienna, Austria.

The museum is located in the Seifensiederhaus at 24 Großen Sperlgasse, one of the oldest buildings in Leopoldstadt, the city's second district. It originated as the Imperial and Royal Police Museum (k.k. Polizeimuseums) in 1899, which then became the Crime and Police Museum of the Viennese Federal Police Directorate (Kriminalpolizeilichen Museum der Bundespolizeidirektion Wien) from 1984 to 1991.

References

External links

 Museum website

1899 establishments in Austria
Museums established in 1899
Museums in Vienna
History museums in Austria
Law enforcement museums in Europe
Law enforcement in Austria
Crime museums
19th-century architecture in Austria